Katie Benzan (born May 16, 1998) is an American professional basketball player who is a free agent in the Women's National Basketball Association (WNBA). She played for the Washington Mystics in 2022. She played college basketball at Maryland and Harvard.

College career

Harvard
During, Benzan's time at Harvard, she proved to be one of the best in the Ivy League right from the start. She was named to the All-Ivy League First Team all three years that she was a Crimson. She was voted onto the First Team unanimously during her 2nd year. In her junior season, she scored her career high in points against Quinnipiac with 27.Prior to her last season at Harvard, Benzan had decided to forgo her senior year and sit out and she left the Harvard team.

On October 28th, 2019, Benzan decided that she would use her graduate season at the University of Texas. By the spring  of 2020, Benzan decided to change her decision and shifted her next school to being Maryland.

Maryland
During her first season at Maryland, Benzan led the entire nation in 3-point field-goal percentage at 50%.She averaged 12.7 points, and broke the Maryland program record for 3-pointers made in a single game against Iowa.At the end of her first season with the Terrapins, Benzan was named to All-Big Ten Second Team and was named an AP Honorable Mention All-American.

Benzan decided to return to College Park for her COVID-Extra year.She continued to be a 3-point specialist, as she broke the Maryland career three-point percentage record  with a 47.4%. While the Terrapins struggled on the court for their standards, Benzan was once against named to the All-Big Ten Second Team from the media, while the coaches awarded her an Honorable Mention.

College statistics

Professional career

Washington Mystics
Benzan went undrafted in the 2022 WNBA Draft, but signed a training camp contract with the Washington Mystics.Benzan made the Opening Day roster, but was cut on May 6, 2022, when the team signed Kennedy Burke.She signed a hardship contract with the Mystics on May 8, 2022. Benzan made WNBA history when she checked into her first ever game on May 8th, as she became the first Dominican player to play in the league. Benzan was released from her hardship contract with the Mystics on May 16, 2022.

Career statistics

Regular season

|-
| align="left" | 2022
| align="left" | Washington
| 3 || 0 || 9.0 || .556 || .714 || .750 || 0.7 || 0.3 || 0.0 || 0.3 || 0.7 || 6.0
|-
| align="left" | Career
| align="left" | 1 year, 1 team
| 3 || 0 || 9.0 || .556 || .714 || .750 || 0.7 || 0.3 || 0.0 || 0.3 || 0.7 || 6.0

References

External links
WNBA bio
Maryland bio
Harvard bio

1998 births
Living people
American women's basketball players
Basketball players from Massachusetts
Guards (basketball)
Harvard Crimson women's basketball players
Maryland Terrapins women's basketball players
Washington Mystics players
Sportspeople from Massachusetts
Undrafted Women's National Basketball Association players